Route 5, or Highway 5, may refer to routes in the following countries:

International
 Asian Highway 5
 European route E05 
 European route E005

Argentina
 National Route 5

Australia

New South Wales 
 M5 Motorway (Sydney)
 The Detour or Toll free Route of the M5 East (https://roadsaustralia.weebly.com/sydneys-guide-to-toll-roads.html)

Northern Territory 
 Tanami Road

Queensland 
 Centenary Motorway (Brisbane)
 
Centenary Motorway (Brisbane)
Western Freeway (Brisbane)
 Legacy Way (Brisbane)
 State Route 5 (Queensland) – Peak Downs Highway
 Metroad 5 - Brisbane

South Australia 
 Anzac Highway, Adelaide

Tasmania 
 Lake Highway, Tasmania

Victoria 
 Metropolitan route 5

Western Australia 
 State Route 5 (Western Australia) – Stirling Highway, Mounts Bay Road, Riverside Drive, and The Causeway

Austria
 Nord Autobahn

Belarus
 M5 highway (Belarus)

Bulgaria
 Автомагистрала „Черно море“/Black Sea motorway
  Републикански път I-5/Route 5 (I-5/E85)

Burma
National Highway 5 (Burma)

Cambodia
 National Highway 5 (Cambodia)

Chile
 Chile Highway 5 - Panamericana

Canada
 Alberta Highway 5
 British Columbia Highway 5 (Yellowhead Highway)
 Manitoba Highway 5
 Northwest Territories Highway 5
 Nova Scotia Trunk 5
 Ontario Highway 5
 Prince Edward Island Route 5
 Quebec Autoroute 5
 Quebec Route 5 (former)
 Saskatchewan Highway 5
 Yukon Highway 5 (Dempster Highway)

China
  G5 Expressway

Costa Rica
 National Route 5

Czech Republic
 D5 Motorway

Djibouti
  RN-5 (Djibouti)

Dominican Republic
  DR-5

Finland
 Finnish national road 5 (Vt5)

Germany
 Bundesautobahn 5 (A5)
 Bundesstraße 5 (B5)

Honduras
CA-5 (Honduras)

Hong Kong
 Route 5 (Hong Kong)

Hungary
 M5 motorway (Hungary)
 Main road 5 (Hungary)

India

Indonesia
Indonesian National Route 5

Iran
 Freeway 5 (Iran)

Iraq
 Highway 5 (Iraq)

Ireland
 N5 road (Ireland)

Israel
 Highway 5 (Israel)

Italy
 Autostrada A5
 RA 5

Japan

 Bayshore Route (Port of Osaka-Kobe)
 Route 5 (Nagoya Expressway)

Jordan

Korea, South
 National Route 5

Malaysia
 Malaysia Federal Route 5
 Shah Alam Expressway (E5)

New Zealand
 New Zealand State Highway 5

Paraguay
 National Route 5

Philippines
 Circumferential Road 5
 Radial Road 5
 N5 highway (Philippines)
 E5 expressway (Philippines)

Republic of the Congo
National Highway 5 (Republic of the Congo)

Romania
 Drumul Naţional 5

Russia
 M5 highway (Russia)

Syria
M5 Motorway (Syria)

Taiwan
  National Freeway 5
  Provincial Highway 5 (Taiwan)

Ukraine
 Highway M05 (Ukraine)

United Kingdom
 M5 motorway (Great Britain)
 A5 road (Great Britain)
 A5 road (Isle of Man)
 M5 motorway (Northern Ireland)
 A5 road (Northern Ireland)

United States
 Interstate 5
 Interstate 5W (former)
 Interstate 5E (former)
 U.S. Route 5
 New England Interstate Route 5 (former)
 Alabama State Route 5
 Alaska Route 5
 Arkansas Highway 5
 California State Route 5 (former)
 Colorado State Highway 5
 Delaware Route 5
 Florida State Road 5
 Georgia State Route 5
 Idaho State Highway 5
 Illinois Route 5
 Indiana State Road 5
 Iowa Highway 5
 K-5 (Kansas highway)
 Kentucky Route 5
 Louisiana Highway 5
 Maine State Route 5
 Maryland Route 5
 M-5 (Michigan highway)
 Minnesota State Highway 5
 County Road 5 (Dakota County, Minnesota)
 County Road 5 (Goodhue County, Minnesota)
 County Road 5 (Hennepin County, Minnesota)
 County Road 5 (Washington County, Minnesota)
 Mississippi Highway 5
 Missouri Route 5
 Montana Highway 5
 Nebraska Highway 5
 Nevada State Route 5 (former)
 Nevada State Route 5C (former)
 New Jersey Route 5
 New Jersey Route 5N (former)
 County Route 5 (Monmouth County, New Jersey)
 New York State Route 5
 County Route 5 (Allegany County, New York)
 County Route 5 (Broome County, New York)
 County Route 5 (Cattaraugus County, New York)
 County Route 5 (Chemung County, New York)
 County Route 5 (Chenango County, New York)
 County Route 5 (Clinton County, New York)
 County Route 5 (Dutchess County, New York)
 County Route 5 (Franklin County, New York)
 County Route 5 (Jefferson County, New York)
 County Route 5 (Niagara County, New York)
 County Route 5 (Oneida County, New York)
 County Route 5 (Ontario County, New York)
 County Route 5 (Otsego County, New York)
 County Route 5 (Rensselaer County, New York)
 County Route 5 (Rockland County, New York)
 County Route 5 (Schoharie County, New York)
 County Route 5 (Steuben County, New York)
 County Route 5 (Suffolk County, New York)
 County Route 5 (Tioga County, New York)
 County Route 5 (Ulster County, New York)
 County Route 5 (Westchester County, New York)
 County Route 5 (Wyoming County, New York)
 North Carolina Highway 5
 North Dakota Highway 5
 Ohio State Route 5
 Oklahoma State Highway 5
 Oklahoma State Highway 5C
 Pennsylvania Route 5
 Rhode Island Route 5
 South Carolina Highway 5
 Tennessee State Route 5
 Texas State Highway 5
 Texas State Highway Loop 5
 Texas State Highway Spur 5
 Texas Farm to Market Road
 Texas Park Road 5
 Texas Recreational Road 5 (former)
Either of two prior designations for highways in Utah
 Utah State Route 5 (1962-1977), the former state designation for Interstate 215
 Utah State Route 5 (1910-1962), a former state highway in Weber and Summit counties that, for a time, also included parts of Interstate 80N (Interstate 84)
 Vermont Route F-5
 Virginia State Route 5
 West Virginia Route 5
Territories
 American Samoa Highway 005
 Guam Highway 5
 Puerto Rico Highway 5

Uruguay 
  Route 5 Gral. Fructuoso Rivera

See also 
 List of A5 roads
 List of N5 roads
 List of highways numbered 5A
 List of highways numbered 5B